The Luke LP, or Banned in the U.S.A.: The Luke LP is an alternate version of 2 Live Crew's Banned in the U.S.A. and was marketed as Luther Campbell's debut album, though there were only minor changes to the track listing, notably, remixes to "Banned in the U.S.A." and "Mama Juanita". It managed to make it to No. 21 on the Billboard 200 and No. 10 on the Top R&B/Hip-Hop Albums chart.

Track listing
"Banned in the U.S.A." – 4:24
"News Flash—People in the News" – 0:16
"Man, Not a Myth" – 3:57
"News Flash "350 Men"" – 0:25
"Fuck Martinez" – 3:55
"News Flash "Super Snoop" – 0:10
"Strip Club" – 3:17
"News Flash "Nation by Storm" – 0:07
"Do the Bart" – 4:28
"In Color—Men on Records" – 0:39
"Face Down, Ass Up" – 3:02
"Hey, Jack!" – 0:55
"Bass 9-1-7" – 4:42
"So Funky" – 4:58
"News Flash "Poll Results"" – 0:10
"Mamolapenga" – 3:02
"Video No Soul" – 0:09
"I Ain't Bullshittin' Part 2" – 6:42
"Commercial—Nasty Motherfuckers" – 0:15
"This Is Luke from the Posse" – 5:15
"News Flash—British Youth" – 0:12
"Fuck a Gang" – 3:56
"Commercial—Inquiring Minds" – 0:07
"Arrest in Effect" – 6:05
"Mega Mix IV" – 3:31

References

1990 debut albums
Luke Records albums
Luther Campbell albums